Weightlifting has been an event at the Asian Games since 1951 in New Delhi.

Editions

Events

Men's events

1951–1954
Bantamweight -56 kg
Featherweight 56–60 kg
Lightweight 60-67.5 kg
Middleweight 67.5–75 kg
Light-heavyweight 75-82.5 kg
Middle-heavyweight 82.5–90 kg
Heavyweight +90 kg

1958–1970 (except 1962)
Flyweight -52 kg
Bantamweight 52–56 kg
Featherweight 56–60 kg
Lightweight 60-67.5 kg
Middleweight 67.5–75 kg
Light-heavyweight 75-82.5 kg
Middle-heavyweight 82.5–90 kg
Heavyweight +90 kg

1974
Flyweight -52 kg
Bantamweight 52–56 kg
Featherweight 56–60 kg
Lightweight 60-67.5 kg
Middleweight 67.5–75 kg
Light-heavyweight 75-82.5 kg
Middle-heavyweight 82.5–90 kg
Heavyweight 90–110 kg
Super heavyweight +110 kg

1978-1990
Flyweight -52 kg
Bantamweight 52–56 kg
Featherweight 56–60 kg
Lightweight 60-67.5 kg
Middleweight 67.5–75 kg
Light-heavyweight 75-82.5 kg
Middle-heavyweight 82.5–90 kg
First-heavyweight 90–100 kg
Heavyweight 100–110 kg
Super heavyweight +110 kg

1994
Flyweight -54 kg
Bantamweight 54–59 kg
Featherweight 59–64 kg
Lightweight 64–70 kg
Middleweight 70–76 kg
Light-heavyweight 76–83 kg
Middle-heavyweight 83–91 kg
First-heavyweight 91–99 kg
Heavyweight 99–108 kg
Super heavyweight +108 kg

1998–present
Bantamweight -56 kg
Featherweight 56–62 kg
Lightweight 62–69 kg
Middleweight 69–77 kg
Light-heavyweight 77–85 kg
Middle-heavyweight 85–94 kg
Heavyweight 94–105 kg
Super heavyweight +105 kg

Women's events

1990
44 kg
48 kg
52 kg
56 kg
60 kg
67.5 kg
75 kg
82.5 kg
+82.5 kg

1994
46 kg
50 kg
54 kg
59 kg
64 kg
70 kg
76 kg
83 kg
+83 kg

1998–present
48 kg
53 kg
58 kg
63 kg
69 kg
75 kg
+75 kg

Medal table

Multiple medalists
The table shows those who have won at least 2 gold medals.

List of medalists

Records

See also
 Asian Weightlifting Championships

External links
Asian Weightlifting Confederation

 
Sports at the Asian Games
Asian Games